Vice admiral (abbreviated as VADM) is the second-highest active rank of the Royal Australian Navy (RAN). It is a three-star rank, and was created as a direct equivalent of the British rank of vice admiral. The rank is held by the Chief of Navy and, when the positions are held by navy officers, by the Vice Chief of the Defence Force, the Chief of Joint Operations, the Chief of Joint Capabilities, or equivalent position.

Vice admiral is a higher rank than rear admiral, but lower than admiral. Vice admiral is the equivalent of air marshal in the Royal Australian Air Force and lieutenant general in the Australian Army.

Since the mid-1990s, the insignia of a Royal Australian Navy vice admiral is the Crown of St. Edward above a crossed sabre and baton, above three silver stars, above the word "AUSTRALIA". The stars have eight points as in the equivalent Royal Navy insignia. Prior to 1995, the RAN shoulder board was identical to the British shoulder board.

List of vice admirals

The following people have held the rank of vice admiral in the Royal Australian Navy:

See also
Ranks of the Royal Australian Navy
Australian Defence Force ranks and insignia

Notes

References

Military ranks of Australia
Royal Australian Navy
Australia